Richard Lionel Tufnell (10 December 1896 – 1 October 1956) was a Conservative Party politician in the United Kingdom.

Richard Tufnell was son of Edward Tufnell, Member of Parliament for South East Essex, and grandson of the civil servant and educationalist Edward Carleton Tufnell.

He was elected as the Member of Parliament for Cambridge at a by-election in 1934, following the ennoblement of the Conservative MP Sir George Newton as Baron Eltisley.

Tufnell retained the seat at the 1935 general election, but ten years later at the 1945 general election, he lost his seat to Arthur Symonds of the Labour Party.

References

External links 
 

1896 births
1956 deaths
Conservative Party (UK) MPs for English constituencies
UK MPs 1931–1935
UK MPs 1935–1945